GigaDevice Semiconductor is a Chinese NOR flash memory designer. It also produces microcontrollers, some of them are based on the ARM architecture (GD32 series), and other on the RISC-V architecture (GD32V series). GD32 chips were introduced in 2015 and are compatible in pinout and periphery options to the STM32 line of microcontrollers.

Integrated Silicon Solution Inc. acquisition
The company participated as part of the Chinese buyer consortium Uphill Investment Co. that acquired Integrated Silicon Solution Inc., a semiconductor company that is among the major producers of NOR flash, in 2015 for US$731 million. The buyer consortium beat out an offer by Cypress Semiconductor, a major competitor of GigaDevice in the NOR flash market.

The buyer consortium of Uphill Investment Co. comprises eTown MemTek Ltd, Summitview Capital, Beijing Integrated Circuit Design and Test Fund, and Huaqing Jiye Investment Management Co., Ltd. GigaDevice along with Beijing ETOWN, an investment firm and economic development agency of the Beijing Municipal Government, were the equity holders of eTown MemTek Ltd.

Microcontroller products 

The GD32 series of microcontrollers are based on the ARM Cortex-M3 core. It was introduced in 2013 and consists of six product lines: Basic, Mainstream, Value, Connectivity, Performance, and Extend. MCU frequency is in range 48-120 MHz. Some GD32 chips are pin-compatible with STM32 series of STMicroelectronics company.

The GD32V series was introduced in 2019 and replaces ARM Cortex cores with custom implementation of RISC-V MCU core named "Bumblebee Core" (designed by Nuclei System Technology).

References

Electronics companies of China
Technology companies of China
Semiconductor companies of China
Manufacturing companies based in Beijing
Companies established in 2005
Chinese brands